Guanylate cyclase activator 2B is a protein that in humans is encoded by the GUCA2B gene.

Function

This gene encodes a preproprotein that is proteolytically processed to generate multiple protein products, including uroguanylin, a member of the guanylin family of peptides and an endogenous ligand of the guanylate cyclase-C receptor. Binding of this peptide to its cognate receptor stimulates an increase in cyclic GMP and may regulate salt and water homeostasis in the intestine and kidneys.

References

Further reading